Lookout (formerly, Whitley's Ford) is a census-designated place in Modoc County, California. Its population is 68 as of the 2020 census, down from 84 from the 2010 census. Lookout's ZIP Code is 96054.

The Whitley's Ford post office operated from 1874 to 1875. The Lookout post office opened in 1880. The original name honors James W. Whitley, a local hotelier. The name Lookout recalls how Native Americans used nearby hills as observation points.

The lynching of 1901
On May 31, 1901, a group of masked men rushed the guards who were watching over five members of an extended family who were being held in custody in the town's hotel as Lookout, California did not have a jail. The men, Daniel Yantes, Martin Wilson, and Frank, Jim and Calvin Hall were taken to the Pitt River Bridge, and hung from the railings. Three had terrorized the locals for years; robbing, stealing, cattle rustling, vandalizing property and livestock. Martin Wilson was 13 years old and completely innocent of any crime. Calvin the step father, also was innocent and was hung for fear of being able to name the members of the lynch mob. He was in his late 70s. The family also ran a safe house at their ranch for criminals on the run. When arrested for their crimes, the clan always hired attorneys who used their skills or bribery to get the charges dropped. On May 30, 1901, the men were taken into custody for cattle rustling, but knowing that there would only be more trouble once the men were given bail, local citizens formed a vigilante committee and lynched them. On June 10, 1901, a grand jury indicted R.E. Leventon, Isom Eades and James Brown and held them for trial. Lookout was suddenly full of reporters, bounty hunters, attorneys and state officials. The men were acquitted in January 1902. The trial cost Modoc County $40,000.  The overwhelming evidence of their guilt was discovered by John Boessenecker and published in his book Badge and Buckshot: Lawlessness in Old California (1988).

Geography
According to the United States Census Bureau, the CDP covers an area of 5.5 square miles (14.1 km), 97.83% of it land and 2.17% water.

Climate
This region experiences warm (but not hot) and dry summers, with no average monthly temperatures above 71.6 °F. According to the Köppen Climate Classification system, Lookout has a warm-summer Mediterranean climate, abbreviated "Csb" on climate maps. Winters are very harsh, with dry cold snow with temperatures sometimes around or below zero.

Demographics
The 2010 United States Census, reported that Lookout had a population of 84. The population density was 15.4 per square mile (5.9/km). The racial makeup of Lookout was 76 (90.5%) White, 0 (0.0%) African American, 2 (2.4%) Native American, 0 (0.0%) Asian, 0 (0.0%) Pacific Islander, 5 (6.0%) from other races, and 1 (1.2%) from two or more races.  Hispanic or Latino of any race were 14 persons (16.7%).

The census reported that 84 people (100% of the population) lived in households.

There were 31 households, of which 7 (22.6%) had children under the age of 18 living in them, 19 (61.3%) were opposite-sex married couples living together, 0 (0%) had a female householder with no husband present, 3 (9.7%) had a male householder with no wife present. There were 3 (9.7%) unmarried opposite-sex partnerships, and 0 (0%) same-sex married couples or partnerships. 7 households (22.6%) were made up of individuals, and 3 (9.7%) had someone living alone who was 65 years of age or older. The average household size was 2.71.  There were 22 families (71.0% of all households); the average family size was 3.14.

19 people (22.6%) were under the age of 18, 8 people (9.5%) aged 18 to 24, 13 people (15.5%) aged 25 to 44, 29 people (34.5%) aged 45 to 64, and 15 people (17.9%) who were 65 years of age or older. The median age was 45.3. For every 100 females, there were 86.7 males. For every 100 females age 18 and over, there were 97.0 males.

There were 46 housing units at an average density of 8.4 per square mile (3.3/km), of which 26 (83.9%) were owner-occupied, and 5 (16.1%) were occupied by renters. The homeowner vacancy rate was 3.7%; the rental vacancy rate was 0%. 70 people (83.3% of the population) lived in owner-occupied housing units and 14 people (16.7%) lived in rental housing units.

Politics

References

Census-designated places in Modoc County, California
Census-designated places in California